The 2016 San Diego Padres season was their 48th season in MLB, and their 12th at Petco Park. The Padres finished with a record of 68 win and 94 losses, and spent most of the season trading with the Arizona Diamondbacks for the last-place spot in the National League West. The Padres set multiple records for offensive futility, becoming the first team in MLB history to fail to score a run in their opening series, being outscored 25-0 in their first three games to the Los Angeles Dodgers. They also set the record for most times shutout in their first ten games (5), as well as the largest opening day shutout loss at home in MLB history (15-0 against the Los Angeles Dodgers).

Offseason
November 2: Josh Johnson, Shawn Kelley, Ian Kennedy, Brandon Morrow, Bud Norris and Justin Upton all elect free agency.
November 3: Clint Barmes elects free agency. Joaquín Benoit gets his option picked up.
November 4: Cory Luebke elects free agency. Padres sent Cory Decker outright to Triple-A El Paso.
November 11: Yankees traded 2B Jose Pirela to Padres for RHP Ronald Herrera.
November 12: Padres traded Joaquín Benoit to Mariners for RHP Enyal De Los Santos and SS Nelson Ward.
November 13: Padres traded Craig Kimbrel to Red Sox for 3B Carlos Asuaje, SS Javier Guerra, LHP Logan Allen, and CF Manuel Margot.
November 20: Padres claimed Josmil Pinto off waivers from Minnesota. Agreed to terms with César Vargas on a one-year contract. Selected the contracts of Manuel Margot from Portland and José Rondón from San Antonio.
December 3: Named Mark McGwire bench coach, Alan Zinter hitting coach, Tarrik Brock first base coach, Doug Bochtler bullpen coach and Eddie Rodríguez assistant coach. Signed Brett Wallace to a one-year contract. Did not tender a 2016 contract to Rocky Gale, Frank Garces and Will Middlebrooks.
December 10: Acquired Jabari Blash from Oakland to complete an earlier trade. Acquired Christian Bethancourt from Atlanta for Casey Kelly and Ricardo Rodriguez.
December 21: Agreed to terms with Buddy Baumann on a one-year contract. Designated Josmil Pinto for assignment.
January 9: Selected the contract of Ryan Buchter from El Paso.
January 15: Agreed to terms with Carlos Villanueva, Derek Norris, Andrew Cashner, Alexei Ramírez, Tyson Ross and Drew Pomeranz to one-year contracts. Selected the contract of Ryan Buchter to the 40-man roster. Designated Rymer Liriano for assignment.
January 29: Traded Rymer Liriano to Milwaukee for Trevor Seidenberger.
February 2: Agreed to terms with Brandon Morrow on a minor league contract.
February 4: Agreed to terms with Fernando Rodney on a one-year contract. Traded Odrisamer Despaigne to Baltimore for Jean Cosme.
February 2: Agreed to terms with Skip Schumaker on a minor league contract.
March 2–18: Agreed to terms with Matt Thornton, Mike Olt, Christian Friedrich, Angel Acevedo and Janigson Villalobos on minor league contracts.
March 29: Acquired Dan Straily from Houston for Erik Kratz. Reassigned Jose Dominguez, Philip Humber and Daniel McCutchen and Rocky Gale to their minor league camp.

Season standings

National League West

National League Wildcard

Record vs. opponents

Regular season

Season summary
Most Runs Scored in a game: 16 (4/9 at COL)
Most Runs Allowed in a game: 16 (2 times)
Longest Winning Streak: 3 games (6 times)
Longest Losing Streak: 5 games (2 times)
Longest Game (Innings): 17 (5/22 vs. LAD)
Times Shutout by Opponent: 15	 
Times Opponent Shutout: 9	 
Walkoff Wins: 8
Walkoff Losses: 8

Home attendance 

Highest Home Attendance: 4/4 vs. LAD (44,317)
Lowest Home Attendance: 5/2 vs. COL (19,013)

Game log

|- bgcolor="ffbbbb"
| 1 || April 4 || Dodgers || 0–15 || Kershaw (1–0) || Ross (0–1) || — || 44,317 || 0–1 || L1
|- bgcolor="ffbbbb"
| 2 || April 5 || Dodgers || 0–3 || Kazmir (1–0) || Shields (0–1) || Jansen (1) || 28,329 || 0–2 || L2
|- bgcolor="ffbbbb"
| 3 || April 6 || Dodgers || 0–7 || Maeda (1–0) || Cashner (0–1) || — || 30,054 || 0–3 || L3
|- bgcolor="bbffbb"
| 4 || April 8 || @ Rockies || 13–6 || Erlin (1–0) || Lyles (0–1) || — || 49,630 || 1–3 || W1
|- bgcolor="bbffbb"
| 5 || April 9 || @ Rockies || 16–3 || Pomeranz (1–0) || De la Rosa (0–1) || — || 35,177 || 2–3 || W2
|- bgcolor="ffbbbb"
| 6 || April 10 || @ Rockies || 3–6 || Bettis (1–0) || Shields (0–2) || McGee (2) || 27,587 || 2–4 || L1
|- bgcolor="bbffbb"
| 7 || April 11 || @ Phillies || 4–3 || Quackenbush (1–0)  || Nola (0–1) || Rodney (1) || 45,229 || 3–4 || W1
|- bgcolor="ffbbbb"
| 8 || April 12 || @ Phillies || 0–3 || Morton (1–1) || Erlin (1–1) || Gómez (3)  || 21,043 || 3–5 || L1
|- bgcolor="ffbbbb"
| 9 || April 13 || @ Phillies || 1–2 || Eickhoff (1–1) || Rea (0–1) || Gómez (4) || 17,638 || 3–6 || L2
|- bgcolor="ffbbbb"
| 10 || April 14 || @ Phillies || 0–3 || Velasquez (2–0) || Pomeranz (1–1) || — || 18,079 || 3–7 || L3
|- bgcolor="ffbbbb"
| 11 || April 15 || D-backs || 2–3 || Hudson (1–0) || Rodney (0–1) || Brad Ziegler (2) || 28,955 || 3–8 || L4
|- bgcolor="bbffbb"
| 12 || April 16 || D-backs || 5–3 (14) || Perdomo (1–0) || De La Rosa (0–3) || — || 34,051 || 4–8 || W1
|- bgcolor="ffbbbb"
| 13 || April 17 || D-backs || 3–7 || Corbin (1–1) || Erlin (1–2) || — || 30,520 || 4–9 || L1
|- bgcolor="bbffbb"
| 14 || April 19 || Pirates || 5–4 || Rea (1–1) || Liriano (1–1) || Rodney (2) || 19,449 || 5–9 || W1
|- bgcolor="bbffbb"
| 15 || April 20 || Pirates || 8–2 || Pomeranz (2–1) || Locke (0–2) || — || 20,681 || 6–9 || W2
|- bgcolor="ffbbbb"
| 16 || April 21 || Pirates || 1–11 || Cole (1–2) || Shields (0–3) || — || 20,387 || 6–10 || L1 
|- bgcolor="bbffbb"
| 17 || April 22 || Cardinals || 4–1 || Cashner (1–1) || Wainwright (0–3) || Rodney (3) || 30,074 || 7–10 || W1
|- bgcolor="ffbbbb"
| 18 || April 23 || Cardinals || 2–11 || Wacha (2–0) || Quackenbush (1–1) || — || 31,688 || 7–11 || L1
|- bgcolor="ffbbbb"
| 19 || April 24 || Cardinals || 5–8 || Siegrist (3–0) || Maurer (0–1) || Rosenthal (5) || 37,395 || 7–12 || L2
|- bgcolor="ffbbbb"
| 20 || April 25 || @ Giants || 4–5 || Bumgarner (2–2) || Pomeranz (2–2) || Casilla (4) || 41,266 || 7–13 || L3
|- bgcolor="ffbbbb"
| 21 || April 26 || @ Giants || 0–1 || Cueto (4–1) || Shields (0–4) || — || 41,413 || 7–14 || L4 
|- bgcolor="ffbbbb"
| 22 || April 27 || @ Giants || 9–13 || Samardzija (3–1) || Cashner (1–2) || — || 41,357 || 7–15 || L5 
|- bgcolor="bbffbb"
| 23 || April 29 || @ Dodgers || 5–1 || Buchter (1–0) || Hatcher (2–3) || — || 49,686 || 8–15 || W1
|- bgcolor="bbffbb"
| 24 || April 30 || @ Dodgers || 5–2 || Rea (2–1) || Stripling (0–2) || Rodney (4) || 45,740 || 9–15 || W2 
|-

|- bgcolor="ffbbbb"
| 25 || May 1 || @ Dodgers || 0–1 || Kershaw (3–1) || Pomeranz (2–3) || — || 49,271 || 9–16 || L1
|- bgcolor="bbffbb"
| 26 || May 2 || Rockies || 2–1 || Shields (1–4) || Gray (0–1)|| Rodney (5)|| 19,013 || 10–16 || W1
|- bgcolor="bbffbb"
| 27 || May 3 || Rockies || 6–3 || Cashner (2–2) || Butler (0–1) || Rodney (6) || 20,394 || 11–16 || W2
|- bgcolor="ffbbbb"
| 28 || May 4 || Rockies || 0–2 || Chatwood (4–2) || Vargas (0–1) || McGee (7) || 20,038 || 11–17 || L1
|- bgcolor="bbffbb"
| 29 || May 5 || Mets || 5–3 || Rea (3–1) || deGrom (3–1) || Rodney (7) || 21,608 || 12–17 || W1
|- bgcolor="bbffbb"
| 30 || May 6 || Mets || 2–0 || Pomeranz (3–3) || Syndergaard (2–2) || Rodney (8) || 30,108 || 13–17 || W2
|- bgcolor="ffbbbb"
| 31 || May 7 || Mets || 3–6 || Colón (3–1) || Shields (1–5) || Familia (9) || 41,028 || 13–18 || L1
|- bgcolor="ffbbbb"
| 32 || May 8 || Mets || 3–4 || Harvey (3–4) || Cashner (2–3) || Familia (10) || 27,461 || 13–19 || L2
|-style="text-align:center; background:#bbb"
| — || May 9 || @ Cubs 
|colspan="7" | Postponed (inclement weather) (Makeup date: May 11)
|- bgcolor="ffbbbb"
| 33 || May 10 || @ Cubs || 7–8 || Lester (4–1) || Vargas (0–2)  || Rondon (7) ||34,680|| 13–20 || L3
|-bgcolor="bbffbb"
| 34 || May 11 (1) || @ Cubs || 7–4 || Villanueva (1–0) || Strop (1–1) || Rodney (9)|| 34,508 || 14–20 || W1
|-bgcolor="bbffbb"
| 35 || May 11 (2) || @ Cubs || 1–0 || Pomeranz (4–3) || Lackey (4–2) || Rodney (10) || 37,828 || 15–20 || W2
|-bgcolor="bbffbb"
| 36 || May 12 || @ Brewers || 3–0 || Shields (2–5) || Nelson (4–3) || Buchter (1) || 17,374 || 16–20 || W3
|- bgcolor="ffbbbb"
| 37 || May 13 || @ Brewers || 0–1 || Guerra (2–0) || Friedrich (0–1) || Jeffress (9) || 35,291 || 16–21 || L1 
|-bgcolor="bbffbb"
| 38 || May 14 || @ Brewers || 8–7 (12) || Campos (1–0) || Capuano (1–1) || Villanueva (1) || 28,896 || 17–21 || W1
|- bgcolor="ffbbbb"
| 39 || May 15 || @ Brewers || 2–3 || Boyer (1–0) || Quackenbush (1–2) || Jeffress (10) || 26,306 || 17–22 || L1
|- bgcolor="ffbbbb"
| 40 || May 17 || Giants || 1–5 || Bumgarner (5–2) || Rea (3–2) || — || 24,433 || 17–23 || L2
|- bgcolor="ffbbbb"
| 41 || May 18 || Giants || 1–2 || Cueto (6–1) || Pomeranz (4–4) || — || 23,518 || 17–24 || L3
|- bgcolor="ffbbbb"
| 42 || May 19 || Giants || 1–3 || Samardzija (6–2) || Shields (2–6) || Casilla (10) || 26,417 || 17–25 || L4
|- bgcolor="bbffbb"
| 43 || May 20 || Dodgers || 7–6 || Quackenbush (2–2) || Jansen (1–1) || — || 31,836 || 18–25 || W1
|- bgcolor="bbffbb"
| 44 || May 21 || Dodgers || 3–2 || Hand (1–0) || Tsao (0–1) || — || 40,221 || 19–25 || W2
|- bgcolor="ffbbbb"
| 45 || May 22 || Dodgers || 5–9 (17) || Stripling (2–3) || Perdomo (1–1) || — || 43,100 || 19–26 || L1
|- bgcolor="ffbbbb"
| 46 || May 23 || @ Giants || 0–1 || Cueto (7–1) || Hand (1–1) || — || 42,099 || 19–27 || L2
|- bgcolor="ffbbbb"
| 47 || May 24 || @ Giants || 2–8 || Samardzija (7–2) || Cashner (2–4) || — || 41,772 || 19–28 || L3
|- bgcolor="ffbbbb"
| 48 || May 25 || @ Giants || 3–4 || Kontos (1–1) || Hand (1–2) || — || 41,772 || 19–29 || L4
|- bgcolor="bbffbb"
| 49 || May 27 || @ D-backs || 10–3 || Friedrich (1–1) || Ray (2–4) || — || 24,935 || 20–29 || W1
|- bgcolor="ffbbbb"
| 50 || May 28 || @ D-backs || 7–8 || Greinke (6–3) || Vargas (0–3) || — || 23,927 || 20–30 || L1
|- bgcolor="ffbbbb"
| 51 || May 29 || @ D-backs || 3–6 ||  Bradley (2–0) || Pomeranz (4–5) || Ziegler (9) || 21,458 || 20–31 || L2
|- bgcolor="ffbbbb"
| 52 || May 30 || @ Mariners || 3–9 || Karns (5–1) || Cashner (2–5) || — || 29,764 || 20–32 || L3
|- bgcolor="ffbbbb"
| 53 || May 31 || @ Mariners || 4–16 || Iwakuma (4–4) || Shields (2–7) || — || 16,815 || 20–33 || L4
|-

|- bgcolor="bbffbb"
| 54 || June 1 || Mariners || 14–6 || Friedrich (2–1) || Paxton (0–1) || — || 20,557 || 21–33 || W1
|- bgcolor="ffbbbb"
| 55 || June 2 || Mariners || 13–16 || Martin (1–0) || Maurer (0–2) || Cishek (13) ||22,588 || 21–34 || L1
|- bgcolor="bbffbb"
| 56 || June 3 || Rockies || 4–0 || Pomeranz (5–5) || Rusin (1–4) || — || 21,588 || 22–34 || W1
|- bgcolor="bbffbb"
| 57 || June 4 || Rockies || 4–3 || Cashner (3–5) || Bettis (4–5) || Rodney (11) || 25,503 || 23–34 || W2 
|- bgcolor="ffbbbb"
| 58 || June 5 || Rockies || 3–10 || Gray (4–2) || Perdomo (1–2) || — || 26,206 || 23–35 || L1
|- bgcolor="bbffbb"
| 59 || June 6 || Braves || 7–2 || Friedrich (3–1) || Pérez (2–2) || — || 20,203 || 24–35 || W1
|- bgcolor="bbffbb"
| 60 || June 7 || Braves || 4–3 || Thornton (1–0) || Vizcaíno (1–1) || — || 22,198 || 25–35 || W2
|- bgcolor="ffbbbb"
| 61 || June 8 || Braves || 2–4 || Teherán (2–6) || Pomeranz (5–6) || Vizcaíno (7) || 22,248 || 25–36 || L1
|- bgcolor="bbffbb"
| 62 || June 10 || @ Rockies || 7–5 || Quackenbush (3–2) || McGee (0–2) || Rodney (12) || 32,663 || 26–36 || W1
|- bgcolor="ffbbbb"
| 63 || June 11 || @ Rockies || 3–5 || Chatwood (8–4) || Johnson (0–3) || Estévez (1) || 29,078 || 26–37 || L1
|- bgcolor="ffbbbb"
| 64 || June 12 || @ Rockies || 1–2 || Germen (2–0) || Quackenbush (3–3) || Logan (1) || 32,946 || 26–38 || L2
|- bgcolor="ffbbbb"
| 65 || June 13 || Marlins || 4–13 || Chen (4–2) || Rea (3–3) || — || 20,988 || 26–39 || L3
|- bgcolor="ffbbbb"
| 66 || June 14 || Marlins || 2–5 || Koehler (5–6) || Pomeranz (5–7) || Ramos (20) || 22,051 || 26–40 || L4
|- bgcolor="bbffbb"
| 67 || June 15 || Marlins || 6–3 || Perdomo (2–2) || Nicolino (2–4) || Rodney (13) || 20,037 || 27–40 || W1
|- bgcolor="ffbbbb"
| 68 || June 16 || Nationals || 5–8 || Roark (6–4) || Johnson (0–4) || Kelley (2) || 22,648 || 27–41 || L1
|- bgcolor="ffbbbb"
| 69 || June 17 || Nationals || 5–7 || Ross (6–4) || Friedrich (3–2) || Petit (1) || 31,137 || 27–42 || L2
|- bgcolor="bbffbb"
| 70 || June 18 || Nationals || 7–3 || Quackenbush (4–3) || Rivero (0–3) || — || 34,113 || 28–42 || W1
|- bgcolor="bbffbb"
| 71 || June 19 || Nationals || 6–3 || Pomeranz (6–7) || Gonzalez (3–6) || Rodney (14) || 32,285 || 29–42 || W2
|- bgcolor="bbffbb"
| 72 || June 21 || @ Orioles || 10–7 || Quackenbush (5–3)||Givens (5–1)|| Rodney (15)||23,876|| 30–42 || W3
|- bgcolor="ffbbbb"
| 73 || June 22 || @ Orioles || 2–7 || Jiménez (4–7)|| Johnson (0–5)||—||23,785|| 30–43 || L1
|- bgcolor="bbffbb"
| 74 || June 23 || @ Reds || 7–4 || Friedrich (4–2)|| Ramirez (1–3)|| Rodney (16)||20,443|| 31–43 || W1
|- bgcolor="bbffbb"
| 75 || June 24 || @ Reds || 13–4 || Rea (4–3)|| Reed (0–1)||—||40,713|| 32–43 || W2
|- bgcolor="bbffbb"
| 76 || June 25 || @ Reds || 3–0 || Pomeranz (7–7)|| Finnegan (3–6)|| Rodney (17)||40,871|| 33–43 || W3
|- bgcolor="ffbbbb"
| 77 || June 26 || @ Reds || 0–3 || DeSclafani (2–0) || Perdomo (2–3) ||Cingrani (9) ||40,085|| 33–44 || L1
|- bgcolor="ffbbbb"
| 78 || June 28 || Orioles || 7–11 || Jiménez (5–7) || Johnson (0–6) ||—||31,515|| 33–45 || L2
|- bgcolor="ffbbbb"
| 79 || June 29 || Orioles || 6–12 || Gallardo (3–1)|| Friedrich (4–3) ||—||25,221|| 33–46 || L3
|-

|- bgcolor="bbffbb"
| 80 || July 1 || Yankees || 7–6 || Rea (5–3) || Eovaldi (6–6) || Maurer (1) ||41,321|| 34–46 || W1
|- bgcolor="bbffbb"
| 81 || July 2 || Yankees || 2–1 || Hand (2–2) || Miller (5–1) || — ||42,315|| 35–46 || W2
|- bgcolor="ffbbbb"
| 82 || July 3 || Yankees || 3–6 || Green (1–1) || Cashner (3–6) || Chapman (16) ||42,131|| 35–47 || L1
|- bgcolor="bbffbb"
| 83 || July 4 || @ D-backs || 8–4 || Perdomo (3–3) || Bradley (3–4) || — || 39,203 || 36–47 || W1
|- bgcolor="ffbbbb"
| 84 || July 5 || @ D-backs || 5–7 || Godley (2–0) || Friedrich (4–4) || Ziegler (18) || 14,110 || 36–48 || L1
|- bgcolor="bbffbb"
| 85 || July 6 || @ D-backs || 13–6 || Dominguez (1–0) || Miller (2–9) || — || 17,091 || 37–48 || W1 
|- bgcolor="bbffbb"
| 86 || July 7 || @ Dodgers || 6–0 || Pomeranz (8–7) || Ryu (0–1) || — ||  44,759 || 38–48 || W2
|- bgcolor="ffbbbb"
| 87 || July 8 || @ Dodgers || 6–10 || Báez (2–2) || Cashner (3–7) || — ||43,588  || 38–49 || L1
|- bgcolor="ffbbbb"
| 88 || July 9 || @ Dodgers || 3–4 || McCarthy (2–0) || Perdomo (3–4) || Jansen (26) || 48,411 || 38–50 || L2 
|- bgcolor="ffbbbb"
| 89 || July 10 || @ Dodgers || 1–3 || Maeda (8–6) || Friedrich (4–5) || Jansen (27) || 42,801 || 38–51 || L3
|- bgcolor="ffbbbb"
|- style="text-align:center; background:#bbcaff;"
| colspan="10" | 87th All-Star Game in San Diego, California
|- bgcolor="bbffbb"
| 90 || July 15 || Giants || 4–1 || Cashner (4–7) || Bumgarner (10–7) || Maurer (2) || 38,522 || 39–51 || W1
|- bgcolor="bbffbb"
| 91 || July 16 || Giants || 7–6 || Quackenbush (6–3) || Casilla (1–3) || — || 40,550 || 40–51 || W2
|- bgcolor="bbffbb"
| 92 || July 17 || Giants || 5–3 || Jackson (1–1) || Cueto (13–2) || Maurer (3) || 38,082 || 41–51 || W3
|- bgcolor="ffbbbb"
| 93 || July 18 || @ Cardinals || 2–10 || Leake (7–7) || Friedrich (4–6) || — || 40,137 || 41–52 || L1
|-style="text-align:center; background:#bbb"
| – || July 19 || @ Cardinals 
|colspan="7" | Postponed (rain) (Makeup date: July 20)
|- bgcolor="ffbbbb"
| 94 || July 20 (1) || @ Cardinals || 2–4 || Martinez (9−6) || Rea (5−4) || Oh (3) || 40,184 || 41–53 || L2
|- bgcolor="ffbbbb"
| 95 || July 20 (2) || @ Cardinals || 2−3 || Garcia (7−6) || Clemens (1–1) || Oh (4) || 41,012 || 41–54 || L3
|- bgcolor="ffbbbb"
| 96 || July 21 || @ Cardinals || 5–6 || Broxton (2–2) || Villanueva (1–1) || — || 40,134 || 41–55 || L4
|- bgcolor="bbffbb"
| 97 || July 22 || @ Nationals || 5–3 || Perdomo (4–4) || Roark (9–6) || Maurer (4) || 31,618 || 42–55 || W1
|- bgcolor="ffbbbb"
| 98 || July 23 || @ Nationals || 2–3 || Papelbon (2–2) || Quackenbush (6–4) || — || 30,747 || 42–56 || L1
|- bgcolor="bbffbb"
| 99 || July 24 || @ Nationals || 10–6 || Buchter (2−0) || Papelbon (2–3) || — || 30,663 || 43–56 || W1
|- bgcolor="ffbbbb"
| 100 || July 25 || @ Blue Jays || 2–4 || Sanchez (11–1) || Rea (5–5) || Osuna (21) || 41,483 || 43–57 || L1
|- bgcolor="ffbbbb"
| 101 || July 26 || @ Blue Jays || 6–7 (12) || Chavez (1–2) || Villanueva (1–2) || — || 45,515 || 43–58 || L2
|- bgcolor="bbffbb"
| 102 || July 27 || @ Blue Jays || 8–4 || Perdomo (5–4) || Dickey (7–12) || — || 47,301 || 44–58 || W1
|- bgcolor="ffbbbb"
| 103 || July 29 || Reds || 0–6 || Finnegan (6–8) || Jackson(1–1) || — || 33,509 || 44–59 || L1
|- bgcolor="bbffbb"
| 104 || July 30 || Reds || 2–1 || Hand (3–2) || Díaz (0–1) || — || 31,620 || 45–59 || W1
|- bgcolor="ffbbbb"
| 105 || July 31 || Reds || 2–3 || Bailey (1–0) || Clemens (1–2) || Cingrani (13) || 27,436 || 45–60 || L1
|-

|- bgcolor="bbffbb"
| 106 || August 1 || Brewers || 7–3 || Villanueva (2–2) || Nelson (6–10) || — || 24,009 || 46–60 || W1
|- bgcolor="ffbbbb"
| 107 || August 2 || Brewers || 2–3 || Davies (9–4) || Perdomo (5–5) || Thornburg (3) || 26,152 || 46–61 || L1
|- bgcolor="bbffbb"
| 108 || August 3 || Brewers || 12–3 || Jackson (2–2) || Guerra (7–3) || — || 24,124 || 47–61 || W1
|- bgcolor="ffbbbb"
| 109 || August 5 || Phillies || 4–5 || Hellickson (9–7) || Friedrich (4–7) || Gómez (28) || 27,521 || 47–62 || L1
|- bgcolor="bbffbb"
| 110 || August 6 || Phillies || 9–7 || Baumann (1–0) || Thompson (0–1) || — || 37,453 || 48–62 || W1
|- bgcolor="ffbbbb"
| 111 || August 7 || Phillies || 5–6 || Eickhoff (7–12) || Hand (3–3) || Gómez (29) || 32,710 || 48–63 || L1
|- bgcolor="ffbbbb"
| 112 || August 9 || @ Pirates || 4–6 || Kuhl (2–0) || Perdomo (5–6) || Watson (3) || 30,269 || 48–64 || L2
|- bgcolor="bbffbb"
| 113 || August 10 || @ Pirates || 4–0 || Jackson (3–2) || Vogelsong (1–2) || — || 29,623 || 49–64 || W1
|- bgcolor="ffbbbb"
| 114 || August 11 || @ Pirates || 0–4 || Taillon (3–2) || Friedrich (4–8) || Watson (4) || 32,071 || 49–65 || L1
|- bgcolor="bbffbb"
| 115 || August 12 || @ Mets || 8–6 || Clemens (2–2) || Verrett (3–8) || Maurer (5) || 24,422 || 50–65 || W1
|- bgcolor="ffbbbb"
| 116 || August 13 || @ Mets || 2–3 || Ynoa (1–0) || Maurer (0–3) || — || 36,854 || 50–66 || L1
|- bgcolor="ffbbbb"
| 117 || August 14 || @ Mets || 1–5 || Matz (9–8) || Richard (0–2) || — || 26,612 || 50–67 || L2
|- bgcolor="ffbbbb"
| 118 || August 15 || @ Rays || 2–8 || Smyly (5–11) || Perdomo (5–7) || — || 10,417 || 50–68 || L3
|- bgcolor="ffbbbb"
| 119 || August 16 || @ Rays || 1–15 || Snell (4–5) || Jackson (3–3) || — || 10,793 || 50–69 || L4
|- bgcolor="ffbbbb"
| 120 || August 17 || @ Rays || 0−2 || Archer (7–16) || Friedrich (4–9) || Colomé (28) || 10,251 || 50–70 || L5
|- bgcolor="bbffbb"
| 121 || August 18 || D-backs || 9–8 || Buchter (3−0) || Barrett (1–1) || Maurer (6) || 32,103 || 51–70 || W1
|- bgcolor="bbffbb"
| 122 || August 19 || D-backs || 7–4 || Quackenbush (7–4) || Corbin (4–13) || — || 26,080 || 52–70 || W2
|- bgcolor="ffbbbb"
| 123 || August 20 || D-backs || 1−2 || Ray (7−11) || Richard (0−3) || Burgos (1) || 32,599 || 52−71 || L1
|- bgcolor="bbffbb"
| 124 || August 21 || D-backs || 9–1 || Perdomo (6–7) || Shipley (2−3) || — || 28,150 || 53–71 || W1
|- bgcolor="ffbbbb"
| 125 || August 22 || Cubs || 1–5 || Lester (4–4) || Jackson (3–4) || — || 31,707 || 53–72 || L1
|- bgcolor="ffbbbb"
| 126 || August 23 || Cubs|| 3–5 ||Arrieta (16–5)||Friedrich  (4–10) ||Chapman (28)||33,614||53–73|| L2
|- bgcolor="ffbbbb"
| 127 || August 24 || Cubs || 3–6 || Hendricks (12–7) || Clemens (2–3) || Chapman (29) || 30,033 || 53–74 || L3
|- bgcolor="ffbbbb"
| 128 || August 26 || @ Marlins || 6–7 || Rodney (2–3) || Maurer (0–4) || — || 17,775 || 53–75 || L4
|- bgcolor="bbffbb"
| 129 || August 27 || @ Marlins || 1–0 || Richard (1−3) || Ureña (2–5) || Quackenbush (1) || 20,007 || 54–75 || W1
|- bgcolor="bbffbb"
| 130 || August 28 || @ Marlins || 3–1 || Perdomo (7–7) || Nicolino (2–6) || — || 19,883 || 55–75 || W2
|- bgcolor="ffbbbb"
| 131 || August 30 || @ Braves || 3–7 || Teherán (4–9) || Jackson (3–5) || — || 20,309 || 55–76 || L1
|- bgcolor="ffbbbb"
| 132 || August 31 || @ Braves || 8–1 || Wisler (6–11) ||  Clemens (2–4) || — || 20,899 || 55–77 || L2 
|-

|- bgcolor="ffbbbb"
| 133 || September 1 || @ Braves || 6–9 || Foltynewicz (8–5) || Cosart (0–2) || Johnson (14) || 22,253 || 55–78 || L3
|- bgcolor="bbffbb"
| 134 || September 2 || @ Dodgers || 4–2 || Hand (4–3) || Liberatore (2–2) || Maurer (7) || 48,911 || 56–78 || W1 
|- bgcolor="ffbbbb"
| 135 || September 3 || @ Dodgers || 1–5 || Hill (11–3) || Perdomo (7–8) || — || 47,590 || 56–79 || L1
|- bgcolor="ffbbbb"
| 136 || September 4 || @ Dodgers || 4–7 || De Leon (1–0) || Quackenbush (7–5) || Jansen (41) || 46,441 || 56–80 || L2
|- bgcolor="bbffbb"
| 137 || September 5 || Red Sox || 2–1 || Jackson (4–5) || Pomeranz (10–11) || Maurer (8) || 40,446 || 57–80 || W1
|- bgcolor="ffbbbb"
| 138 || September 6 || Red Sox || 1–5 || Buchholz (6–10) || Clemens (2–5)  || — || 30,644 || 57–81 || L1
|- bgcolor="ffbbbb"
| 139 || September 7 || Red Sox || 2–7 || Price (15–8) || Cosart (0–3) || — || 31,662 || 57–82 || L2 
|- bgcolor="bbffbb"
| 140 || September 8 || Rockies || 14–1 || Richard (2−3) ||Hoffman (0−3)   || — || 26,053 || 58–82 || W1
|- bgcolor="ffbbbb"
| 141 || September 9 || Rockies || 1–4 || Chatwood (11–9) || Perdomo (7–9) || Ottavino (3) || 25,015 || 58–83 || L1
|- bgcolor="bbffbb"
| 142 || September 10 || Rockies || 6–3 || Friedrich  (5–10) || Gray (9–8) || Maurer (9) || 23,719 || 59–83 || W1
|-bgcolor="ffbbbb"
| 143 || September 11 || Rockies || 2–3 (10) || McGee (2–3) || Quackenbush (7–6) || Ottavino (4) || 25,133|| 59–84 || L1
|- bgcolor="bbffbb"
| 144 || September 12 || @ Giants || 4–0 || Clemens (2–5) || Samardzija (11–10) || — || 41,233 || 60–84 || W1
|- bgcolor="bbffbb"
| 145 || September 13 || @ Giants || 6–4 || Smith (1–0) || Strickland (3–3) || Quackenbush (2) || 41,231 || 61–84 || W2
|- bgcolor="bbffbb"
| 146 || September 14 || @ Giants || 3–1 || Perdomo (8–9) || Bumgarner (10–7) || Maurer (10) || 41,183 || 62–84 || W3
|-bgcolor="ffbbbb"
| 147 || September 16 || @ Rockies || 7–8 || Ottavino (1–2) || Maurer (0–5) || — || 30,451 || 62–85 || L1
|-bgcolor="ffbbbb"
| 148 || September 17 || @ Rockies || 0–8 || Gray (10–8) || Jackson (4–6) || — || 34,724 || 62–86 || L2
|-bgcolor="ffbbbb"
| 149 || September 18 || @ Rockies || 3–6 || Bettis (13–4) || Cosart (0–4) || Ottavino (5) || 25,811 || 62–87 || L3 
|- bgcolor="bbffbb"
| 150 || September 19 || D-backs || 3–2 || Richard (3−3) || Shipley (4−4) || Maurer (11) || 20,250 || 63–87 || W1
|- bgcolor="bbffbb"
| 151 || September 20 || D-backs || 5–2 || Hessler (1–0) || Godley (4−4) || Maurer (12) || 34,319 || 64–87 || W2
|-bgcolor="ffbbbb"
| 152 || September 21 || D-backs || 2–3 || Greinke (4−4) || Perdomo (8–10) || Hudson (4) || 22,110 || 64–88 || L1
|-bgcolor="ffbbbb"
| 153 || September 22 || Giants || 1–2 || Samardzija (12–10) || Friedrich  (5–11) || Romo (2) || 25,789 || 64–89 || L2
|- bgcolor="bbffbb"
| 154 || September 23 || Giants || 7–2 || Jackson (5–6) || Suárez (3–5) || — || 28,404 || 65–89 || W1
|-bgcolor="ffbbbb"
| 155 || September 24 || Giants || 6–9 || Smith (2–4) || Quackenbush (7–7) || Romo (3) || 31,171 || 65–90 || L1 
|- bgcolor="bbffbb"
| 156 || September 25 || Giants || 4–3 || Morrow (1–0) || Gearrin (3–2) || Hand (1) || 28,456 || 66–90 || W1
|- bgcolor="bbffbb"
| 157 || September 27 || Dodgers || 7–1 || Clemens (4–5) || Maeda (16–10) || — || 27,376 || 67–90 || W2 
|- bgcolor="bbffbb"
| 158 || September 28 || Dodgers || 6–5 || Perdomo (9–10) || Stripling (5–9) || Maurer (13) || 29,471 || 68–90 || W3
|-bgcolor="ffbbbb"
| 159 || September 29 || Dodgers || 4–9 || Anderson (5–9) || Friedrich  (5–12) || — || 35,804 || 68–91 || L1
|-bgcolor="ffbbbb"
| 160 || September 30 || @ D-backs || 3–5 ||Delgado (5–2) || Jackson (5–7) || Hudson (1–0) || 42,651 || 68–92 || L2
|-

|-bgcolor="ffbbbb"
| 161 || October 1 || @ D-backs || 5–9 || Bradley (8–9) || Richard (3−4) || — || 32,811 || 68–93 || L3
|-bgcolor="ffbbbb"
| 162 || October 2 || @ D-backs || 2–3 || Hudson (3-2) || Hand (4-4) || — || 31,385 || 68–94 || L4
|-

Roster

Player stats

Both tables are sortable.

Batting

Final stats through October 2, 2016. Players in bold are on the active roster as of the 2022 season.

Note: G = Games played; AB = At bats; R = Runs scored; H = Hits; 2B = Doubles; 3B = Triples; HR = Home runs; RBI = Runs batted in; BB = Walks; SO = Strikeouts; AVG = Batting average; SB = Stolen bases

† = Stats only with Padres

Pitching
Final stats through October 2, 2016.
Players in bold are on the active roster as of the 2022 MLB season.

Note: W = Wins; L = Losses; ERA = Earned run average; G = Games pitched; GS = Games started; SV = Saves; IP = Innings pitched; H = Hits allowed; R = Runs allowed; ER = Earned runs allowed; BB = Walks allowed; K = Strikeouts 

† = Stats only with PadresFarm systemUpdated as of September 24, 2016''

References

External links
San Diego Padres official site
2016 San Diego Padres at baseball-reference.com

San Diego Padres seasons
San Diego Padres
San Diego Padres